Gábor Eperjesi (born 12 January 1994) is a Hungarian professional footballer who plays for Romanian club Csíkszereda.

Career
In January 2023, Eperjesi joined Csíkszereda in Romania.

Club statistics

Updated to games played as of 10 May 2021.

Honours
Diósgyőr
Hungarian League Cup (1): 2013–14

References

External links
 MLSZ 
 HLSZ 
 

1994 births
Sportspeople from Miskolc
Living people
Hungarian footballers
Hungary youth international footballers
Hungary under-21 international footballers
Association football defenders
Diósgyőri VTK players
Mezőkövesdi SE footballers
FK Csíkszereda Miercurea Ciuc players
Nemzeti Bajnokság I players
Nemzeti Bajnokság II players
Liga II players
Hungarian expatriate footballers
Expatriate footballers in Romania
Hungarian expatriate sportspeople in Romania